Monotropism is a cognitive strategy posited to be the central underlying feature of autism. A monotropic mind is one that focuses its attention on a small number of interests at any time, tending to miss things outside of this attention tunnel. The theory of monotropism was developed by Dinah Murray, Wenn Lawson and Mike Lesser starting in the 1990s, and published about in the journal Autism in 2005. Wenn Lawson's further work on the theory formed the basis of his PhD, Single Attention and Associated Cognition in Autism, and book The Passionate Mind (Lawson, 2011).

A tendency to focus attention tightly has a number of psychological implications. While monotropism tends to cause people to miss things outside their attention tunnel, within it their focused attention can lend itself to intense experiences, deep thinking and flow states. However, this hyperfocus makes it harder to redirect attention, including starting and stopping tasks, leading to what is often described as executive dysfunction in autism, and stereotypies or perseveration where a person's attention is repeatedly pulled back to the same thing.

Characteristics 

 

Since the amount of attention available to a person is limited, cognitive processes are forced to compete. In the monotropic mind, interests that are active at any given time tend to consume most of the available attention, causing difficulty with tasks that demand a broad attention span, including conventional social interaction. Language development can be affected, both through the broad attention required and the psychological impact of language providing a tool for others to manipulate a child's interest system. As Murray et al. argue: 'Disruption of the attention tunnel is a painful experience. Language may suddenly become unattractive for a deeply monotropic infant.'

In the monotropism account, theory of mind difficulties seen in autistic people are not a 'core deficit' central to autism, but rather follow from the attentional demands of social interaction. As the autistic sociologist Damian Milton puts it, 'recognition of others may only occur if connected to the fulfilling of interests that the autistic individual has, otherwise the existence of others may not be registered at all. A monotropic focus leads to a fragmented view of the world, and from such a viewpoint it is exceptionally hard to make sense of social interactions, leading to potentially both apparent and real ‘theory of mind’ difficulties.'

Monotropic individuals have trouble processing multiple things at once, particularly when it comes to multitasking while listening. Some have trouble taking notes in class while listening to a teacher, and may find it difficult to read a person's face and comprehend what they are saying simultaneously. A common tendency is for individuals to avoid complex sensory environments because of this hypersensitivity.

In order for a person to be identified/diagnosed as autistic, they must exhibit a restricted and repetitive behavior (RRB). These behaviors arise due to the inability of the monotropic individual to shift attention and cause obsession with an object or ritual. Murray and Lesser describe the mind of a monotropic individual as working much like that of a hunter, with the person fully believing what is currently being seen, and suppressing knowledge learned previously. This account is strongly echoed in later work by Karvelis et al. in the predictive processing model. This mind is capable of suppressing pain and focusing attention on something else. It has the ability to develop great depth in a given interest or skill rather than gaining breadth in an array of interests.

Implications for practice 
To help autistic individuals in understanding and navigating the world, Murray et al. propose that certain steps could be helpful. These include:
 Increase connections with other people through the child's interests: 'start where the child is'.
 Allow them to pursue their own interests, and build understanding that way.
 Improve understanding in order to correct false or partial connections.
 Make tasks more attainable by decreasing the number and complexity of them.
 Make tasks and connections more meaningful.

The focus should not be just on the autistic person's behaviours, skills or understandings; it is vital - and rewarding - for those around them to put in work to understand their perspectives, too.

See also
 Autism and memory
 Autism and working memory

References 

Autism
Learning disabilities
Cognition